The Women's singles luge competition at the 1984 Winter Olympics in Sarajevo was held from 9 to 12 February, at Sarajevo Olympic Bobsleigh and Luge Track.

Results

References

Luge at the 1984 Winter Olympics
1984 in women's sport
Luge